{{DISPLAYTITLE:C13H18O}}
The molecular formula C13H18O (molar mass: 190.28 g/mol, exact mass: 190.1358 u) may refer to:

 Bourgeonal
 Cyclamen aldehyde
 Damascenone

Molecular formulas